The Grand dictionnaire terminologique (GDT) is an online terminological database containing nearly 3 million French, English and Latin technical terms in 200 industrial, scientific and commercial fields.

The GDT has existed in a number of formats over the years, including a dial-up service known as Banque de terminologie du Québec (BTQ), and a CD-ROM version. LGDT is now available only as a freely-accessible web site.

Produced by the Office québécois de la langue française, the GDT is the result of thirty years of work by Quebec-based terminologists. It is the most complete translation resource for Canadian English-language technical terms.

Quebec French 
When translations differ between Quebec French and "Standard French", – for example in the expression "cerebrovascular accident" (CVA), translated as accident cérébrovasculaire (ACV) in Quebec French and accident vasculaire cérébral in France – the two forms are both given with a paragraph describing their origins, usage and conformity. The GDT thus allows writers to adapt their writing to suit their audience, be it North American, European or African.

1990 Reforms of French orthography 
The GDT uses the 1990 Reforms of French orthography with loanwords and neologisms. It also prioritises usage of each word by its prominence in other authoritative works.

References

External links 
 
 
 

Lexicography
French language
Translation databases
Databases in Canada